The 2011 Texas Tennis Open was a tennis tournament played on outdoor hard courts. It was the first edition of the tournament . It was classified as one of the WTA International tournaments of the 2011 WTA Tour. It was played in Dallas, United States.

WTA entrants

Seeds

 1 Seedings are based on the rankings of August 15, 2011.

Other entrants
The following players received wildcards into the singles main draw
  Irina Falconi
  Melanie Oudin
  Shahar Pe'er

The following players received entry from the qualifying draw:

  Kateryna Bondarenko
  Angelique Kerber
  Aravane Rezaï
  Chanelle Scheepers

The following player received entry from a Lucky loser spot:
  Akgul Amanmuradova

Champions

Singles

 Sabine Lisicki def.  Aravane Rezaï, 6–2, 6–1
It was Lisicki's 2nd title of the year and 3rd of her career.

Doubles

 Alberta Brianti /  Sorana Cîrstea def.  Alizé Cornet /  Pauline Parmentier, 7–5, 6–3

External links

Official Website

Texas Tennis Open
Tennis tournaments in the United States
Texas Tennis Open
Tennis Open
Texas Tennis Open
Texas Tennis Open